El rincón de los prodigios (English title: The corner of the prodigies) is a Mexican telenovela produced by Guillermo Diazayas for Televisa. It aired from 1987 to 1988.

Plot 
The series is based mainly on the differences, between Mexican ancestral beliefs and fervent religious faith imposed by Catholicism, surrounded by mysteries, mystery and magic. Monchito has supernatural healing powers.

Cast 
 Demián Bichir as Monchito
 Alma Delfina as Mari
 Jorge Russek
 Silvia Mariscal as Soledad
 Tina Romero as Mercedes
 Mercedes Pascual as Rosario
 Tony Carbajal as Father Agustín
 Socorro Avelar as Martina
 Arsenio Campos as Sebastián
 Juan Carlos Serrán as Ramón
 Miguel Suárez as Father Gonzalo
 Luisa Huertas as Lucrecia
 Elizabeth Dupeyrón as Roxana
 Odiseo Bichir as Father Matías
 Christian Ramírez as Monchito (child)
 Evangelina Sosa as Mari (child)
 Carlos Ignacio as Chaparro

Awards

References

External links 

1987 telenovelas
Mexican telenovelas
Televisa telenovelas
1987 Mexican television series debuts
1988 Mexican television series endings
Spanish-language telenovelas
Television shows set in Mexico